Senator Perkins may refer to:

Members of the United States Senate
Bishop W. Perkins (1841–1894), U.S. Senator from Kansas from 1892 to 1893
George Clement Perkins (1839–1923), U.S. Senator from California from 1893 to 1915
Neptune Perkins, fictional U.S. Senator in the D.C. Comics universe

United States state senate members
Bill Perkins (politician) (born 1950), New York State Senate
Colonel Simon Perkins (1805–1887), Ohio State Senate
Drew Perkins (born 1956), Wyoming State Senate
Elias Perkins (1767–1845), Connecticut State Senate
George B. Perkins (1874–1955), Iowa State Senate
George D. Perkins (1840–1914), Iowa State Senate
Stephen W. Perkins (1809–after 1869), Texas State Senate
Thomas Clap Perkins (1798–1870), Connecticut State Senate